The Minor Planet Bulletin is a quarterly peer-reviewed open-access scientific journal. Its focus is on theoretical, observational, and historical information regarding the study of minor planets. The journal mainly targets amateur research, but it includes professional research as well.
It has been published by the Minor Planets section of the Association of Lunar and Planetary Observers since 1973 and the editor-in-chief is Richard P. Binzel (Massachusetts Institute of Technology).

Operations
All editorial, production, and distribution tasks are performed on a volunteer basis, many by amateur astronomers.

See also

 List of astronomy journals

References

Further reading

External links

English-language journals
Minor planets
Open access journals
Planetary science journals
Publications established in 1973
Quarterly journals